The Matenadaran, officially the Mesrop Mashtots Institute of Ancient Manuscripts, is a museum, repository of manuscripts, and a research institute in Yerevan, Armenia. It is the world's largest repository of Armenian manuscripts.

It was established in 1959 on the basis of the nationalized collection of the Armenian Church, formerly held at Etchmiadzin. Its collection has gradually expanded since its establishment, mostly from individual donations. One of the most prominent landmarks of Yerevan, it is named after Mesrop Mashtots, the inventor of the Armenian alphabet, whose statue stands in front of the building.

Name
The word մատենադարան, matenadaran is a compound composed of մատեան, matean ("book" or "parchment") and դարան, daran ("repository"). According to Hrachia Acharian both words are of Middle Persian (Pahlavi) origin. Though it is sometimes translated as "scriptorium" in English, a more accurate translation is "repository or library of manuscripts." In medieval Armenia, the term matenadaran was used in the sense of a library as all books were manuscripts.

Some Armenian manuscript repositories around the world are still known as matenadaran, such as the ones at the Mekhitarist monastery in San Lazzaro, Venice and the Armenian Patriarchate of Constantinople, and the Vatche and Tamar Manoukian Manuscript Depository at the Mother See of Holy Etchmiadzin. To distinguish it from others, it is often referred to as the Matenadaran of Yerevan, the Yerevan Matenadaran or Mashtots Matenadaran.

History

Historic predecessors

The earliest mention of a manuscript repository in Armenia was recorded in the writings of the fifth century historian Ghazar Parpetsi, who noted the existence of such a repository at the Etchmiadzin catholicosate in Vagharshapat, where Greek and Armenian language texts were kept. Sources remain silent on the fate of the Etchmiadzin matenadaran until the 15th century, when the catholicosate returned from Sis in Cilicia. Manuscript repositories existed at major monasteries in medieval Armenia, such as at Haghpat (Haghpat matenadaran), Sanahin, Saghmosavank, Tatev, Geghard, Kecharis, Hromkla, and Bardzraberd. In some cases, monastic complexes have separate structures as manuscript repositories. Sometimes manuscripts would be transferred to caves to avoid destruction by foreign invaders. Thousands of manuscripts in Armenia were destroyed over the course of the tenth to fifteenth centuries during the Turkic and Mongol invasions. According to the medieval Armenian historian Stepanos Orbelian, the Seljuk Turks were responsible for the burning of over 10,000 Armenian manuscripts in Baghaberd in 1170.

Modern Matenadaran 

As a result of Armenia being a constant battleground between two major powers, the Matenadaran in Etchmiadzin was pillaged several times, the last of which took place in 1804, during the Russo-Persian War. Eastern Armenia's annexation by the Russian Empire in the early 19th century provided a more stable climate for the preservation of the remaining manuscripts. Whereas in 1828 the curators of the Matenadaran catalogued a collection of only 1,809 manuscripts, in 1863 the collection had increased to 2,340 manuscripts, and in 1892 to 3,338 manuscripts. Prior to World War I, in 1914, the collected had reached 4,660 manuscripts. The collection was sent to Moscow for safekeeping since Etchmiadzin was close to the war zone.

Thousands of Armenian manuscripts were destroyed during the genocide in the Ottoman Empire.

On December 17, 1920, just two weeks after the demise of the First Republic of Armenia and Sovietization of Armenia, the new Bolshevik government of Armenia issued a decree nationalizing all cultural and educational institutions in Armenia. The issue, signed by Minister of Education Ashot Hovhannisyan, declared the manuscript repository of Etchmiadzin the "property of the working peoples of Armenia." It was put under the supervision of Levon Lisitsian, an art historian and the newly appointed commissar of all cultural and educational institutions of Etchmiadzin. In March 1922 the manuscripts from Etchmiadzin that had been sent to Moscow during World War I were ordered to be returned to Armenia by Alexander Miasnikian. 1,730 manuscripts were added to the original 4,660 manuscripts held at Etchmiadzin once they returned to Armenia.

In 1939 the entire collection of manuscripts of Etchmiadzin were transferred to the State Public Library in Yerevan (what later became the National Library of Armenia) by the decision of the Soviet Armenian government. In the same year there were 9,382 cataloged manuscripts at the Matenadaran. On March 3, 1959, the Council of Ministers of Soviet Armenian officially established the Matenadaran as an "institute of scientific research with special departments of scientific preservation, study, translation and publication of manuscripts" in a new building. It was named after Mesrop Mashtots, the creator of the Armenian alphabet, in 1962.

Architecture

Old building 
The Matenadaran is located at the foot of a small hill on the northern edge of Mashtots Avenue, the widest road in central Yerevan. The building has been variously described as monumental, imposing, and stern. Herbert Lottman called it "solemn and solid-looking." Soviet travel writer Nikolai Mikhailov opined that "In its dimensions and architecture it is a palace." The building is listed as a national monument by the government of Armenia.

It was built in gray basalt from 1945 to 1958, however, construction was put on hold from 1947 to 1953 due to unavailability of skilled laborers. Designed by Yerevan's chief architect Mark Grigorian, it is influenced by medieval Armenian architecture. According to Murad Hasratyan, the façade of the Matenadaran is influenced by the 11th century Holy Apostles (Arakelots) church of Ani, the grand capital of Bagratid Armenia. However, Grigorian noted that the facade design (an entrance in the middle with two decorative niches on the two sides) has ancient roots, appearing at the ancient Egyptian Temple of Edfu, and then at the Holy Apostles church and the Baronial Palace of Ani. Grigorian designed the entrance hall in line with the gavit (narthex) of Sanahin Monastery. The building was renovated in 2012.

A 1960 mural by Van Khachatur (Vanik Khachatrian) depicting the Battle of Avarayr is located in the entrance hall. Three murals created by Khachatur in 1959 that depict three periods of Armenian history: Urartu, Hellenism, and the Middle Ages—surround the steps leading to the main exhibition hall. A large ivory medallion with a diameter of 2 meters depicting the portrait of Vladimir Lenin by Sergey Merkurov was previously hung in the lecture hall. In the 1970s American archivist Patricia Kennedy Grimsted noted that Matenadaran is one of the few places in Soviet Armenia with air conditioning.

From 1963 to 1967, the statues of historical Armenian scholars, Toros Roslin, Grigor Tatevatsi, Anania Shirakatsi, Movses Khorenatsi, Mkhitar Gosh and Frik, were erected on the left and right wings of the building's exterior. They each represent one field: manuscript illumination, philosophy, cosmology, history, jurisprudence, and poetry, respectively. The statues of Mesrop Mashtots and his disciple Koryun (1962) are located below the terrace where the main building stands. Since the 1970s an open-air exhibition is located near the entrance of the building. On display there are khachkars from the 13th-17th centuries, a tombstone from the Noratus cemetery, a vishap dated 2nd-1st millennia BC, a door from Teishebaini (Karmir Blur), a Urartian archaeological site.

New building

The new building of the Matenadaran was designed by Arthur Meschian, an architect better known as a musician, to house the increasing number of manuscripts. A five-story building, it is three times larger than the old one. It is equipped with a high-tech laboratory, where manuscripts are preserved, restored and digitized. Meschian noted that he designed the new building in a way to not compete with the old one, but instead be a continuation of it. It was initially planned to be constructed in the late 1980s, but was not realized because of the 1988 Armenian earthquake, the First Nagorno-Karabakh War and the economic crisis that ensued. Financed by Moscow-based Armenian businessman Sergei Hambartsumian (US$10 million) and Maxim Hakobian, director of the Zangezur Copper and Molybdenum Combine (US$4 million), it was built from May 2009 to September 2011. It was inaugurated on September 20, 2011 on the eve of celebrations of the 20th anniversary of Armenia's independence in attendance of President Serzh Sargsyan, Catholicoi Karekin II of Etchmiadzin and Aram I of Cilicia, Artsakh President Bako Sahakyan, and others.

Collection

Currently, the Matenadaran contains a total of some 23,000 manuscripts and scrolls—including fragments. It is, by far, the single largest collection of Armenian manuscripts in the world. Furthermore, over 500,000 documents such as imperial and decrees of catholicoi, various documents related to Armenian studies, and archival periodicals. The manuscripts cover a wide array of subjects: religious and theological works (Gospels, Bibles, lectionaries, psalters, hymnals, homilies, and liturgical books), texts on history, mathematics, geography, astronomy, cosmology, philosophy, jurisprudence, medicine, alchemy, astrology, music, grammar, rhetoric, philology, pedagogy, collections of poetry, literary texts, and translations from Greek and Syriac. The writings of classical and medieval historians Movses Khorenatsi, Yeghishe and Koryun are preserved here, as are the legal, philosophical and theological writings of other notable Armenian figures. The preserved writings of Grigor Narekatsi and Nerses Shnorhali at the Matenadaran form the cornerstone of medieval Armenian literature.

The manuscripts previously held at Etchmiadzin constitute the core of the Matenadaran collection. The rest came from the Lazarev Institute of Oriental Languages in Moscow, the Nersisian Seminary and the Armenian Ethnographic Society, both in Tbilisi, and the Yerevan Museum of Literature.

When it was established as a distinct institution in 1959, the Matenadaran had around 10,000 Armenian manuscripts and 4,000 fragments (partial volumes or isolated pages) dating as early as the 5th century. At the time there were some one thousand manuscripts in other languages, such as Persian, Syriac, Arabic, Greek, Georgian, Russian, Hebrew, Hindi, Tamil, Latin, Ethiopian (Amharic), and other languages. Some originals, written in other languages, have been saved only in their Armenian translations.

There has been steady growth in the number of manuscripts preserved at the Matenadaran, mostly from gifts from private individuals from the Armenian diaspora. In 1972 there were already 12,960 Armenian manuscripts and nearly two thousand manuscripts in other languages. Among the major donors of the Matenadaran include Harutiun Hazarian from New York (397 manuscripts), Varouzhan Salatian from Damascus (150 manuscripts), Rafael Markossian from Paris (37 manuscripts). Rouben Galichian from London has donated old maps. In 1969 Tachat Markossian, 95, from the village of Gharghan, near Isfahan, in central Iran, donated a 1069 manuscript to the Matenadaran. Written at Narekavank monastery, it is a copy of a Gospel written by Mashtots.

Notable manuscripts

Among the most significant manuscripts of the Matenadaran are the Lazarian Gospel (9th century), the Echmiadzin Gospel (10th century) and the Mughni Gospel (11th century). The first, so called because it was brought from the Lazarian Institute, is from 887 and is one of the Matenadaran's oldest complete volumes. The Echmiadzin Gospel, dated 989, has a 6th-century, probably Byzantine, carved ivory cover. The Cilician illuminated manuscripts by Toros Roslin (13th century) and Sargis Pitsak (14th century), two prominent masters, are also held with high esteem.

Three manuscripts are allowed to leave the Matenadaran on a regular basis. The first is the Vehamor Gospel, donated to the Matenadaran by Catholicos Vazgen I in 1975. It probably dates to the 7th century and is, thus, the oldest complete extant Armenian manuscript. The name refers to the mother of the Catholicos (vehamayr), to whose memory Vazgen I dedicated the manuscript. Since Levon Ter-Petrosyan in 1991, all president of Armenia have given their oath on this book. The other two, the Shurishkani Gospel (1498, Vaspurakan) and the Shukhonts' Gospel (1669) are taken to the churches of Mughni and Oshakan every year to be venerated.

Other items
Besides manuscripts, the Matenadaran holds a copy of the Urbatagirk, the first published Armenian book (1512, Venice) and all issues of the first Armenian magazine Azdarar ("Herald"), published in Madras, India from 1794 to 1796. The first map printed in Armenian—in Amsterdam in 1695—is also kept at the Matenadaran.

Artsakh branch at Gandzasar
A branch of the Matenadaran was established next to the monastery of Gandzasar in the Republic of Artsakh (Nagorno-Karabakh) in 2015.

Publications

Catalogs
The first complete catalog of the Matenadaran manuscripts («Ցուցակ ձեռագրաց») was published in two volumes in 1965 and 1970 with a supplementary volume in 2007. These three volumes listed 11,100 manuscripts kept at the Matenadaran with short descriptions. Since 1984, a more detailed catalog has been published, titled The Main List of Armenian Manuscripts («Մայր ցուցակ հայերէն ձեռագրաց»). As of 2019, ten volumes have been published.

Banber Matenadarani
The Matenadaran publishes the scholarly journal Banber Matenadarani (Բանբեր Մատենադարանի, "Herald of the Matenadaran") since 1941. The articles are usually devoted to the manuscripts and editions of texts contained in the collection. The journal has been praised for its high quality of scholarship.

Significance and recognition

The Matenadaran collection was inscribed by the UNESCO into the Memory of the World Register in 1997, recognizing it as a valuable collection of international significance. American diplomat John Brady Kiesling described the Matenadaran as a "world-class museum." 

Anthropologist Levon Abrahamian argues that the Matenadaran has become a sanctuary and temple for Armenians, where manuscripts are treated not only with scientific respect, but also adoration. Armenian President Serzh Sargsyan stated in 2011: "Today, the Matenadaran is a national treasure which has become the greatest citadel of the Armenian identity." Asoghik Karapetyan, director of Museums and Archives of the Mother See of Holy Etchmiadzin, called the Matenadaran one of the holiest sites of Armenian identity, along with Mount Ararat and Etchmiadzin.

Thomas de Waal notes that alongside several other institutions (e.g. the Opera, National Gallery) the Matenadaran was central in the Soviet efforts to make Yerevan a "repository of Armenian myths and hopes." Abrahamian argues that the secular Matenadaran continued the traditions of the monastery museums within an atheist state. According to Nora Dudwick, in the Soviet period, the Matenadaran "symbolized the central values of Armenian culture [and signified] to Armenians the high level of culture and learning their ancestors achieved as early as the fifth century." 

Karen Demirchyan, the Soviet Armenian leader, wrote in a 1984 book that "For the first time there was no need to save Armenian books and manuscripts from destruction by endless wanderings, for they are preserved in the temple of priceless creations of the people's mind and talent, the Yerevan Matenadaran." The Communist Party's official newspaper, Pravda, wrote in 1989 that no educated Soviet citizen can "imagine spiritual life without the capital's Tretyakov Gallery, the Leningrad Hermitage, and the Yerevan Matenadaran." In 1990 the Soviet Union issued a 5 ruble commemorative coin depicting the Matenadaran.

Visitors
The Matenadaran has become one of the landmarks and major touristic attractions of Yerevan since its establishment. In 2016 it attracted some 89,000 visitors, and around 132,600 in 2019. 

Many foreign dignitaries have visited the Matenadaran, including Leonid Brezhnev (1970), Indira Gandhi (1976), Charles, Prince of Wales (2013), Vladimir Putin (2001), Sirindhorn (2018), Boris Tadić (2009), Sergio Mattarella, José Manuel Barroso (2012), Bronisław Komorowski, Heinz Fischer, Valdis Zatlers, Rumen Radev, and others.

Notable staff

Directors
Gevorg Abov (1940–1952)
Levon Khachikian (1954–1982)
Sen Arevshatyan (1982–2007)
Hrachya Tamrazyan (2007–2016)
Vahan Ter-Ghevondyan (2018–)

Notable researchers
Gevorg Emin, poet. He worked briefly at the Matenadaran in the 1940s.
Rafael Ishkhanyan, linguist, political activist and MP. He worked at the Matenadaran from 1961 to 1963.
Nouneh Sarkissian, First Lady of Armenia (2018–2022). She worked at the Matenadaran in the 1980s.
Levon Ter-Petrosyan, the first president of Armenia (1991–98). He worked at the Matenadaran from 1978 to 1991. He was initially a junior researcher, but became a senior researcher in 1985.
Asatur Mnatsakanian, philologist and historian. He worked at the Matenadaran from 1940 until his death in 1983.

References
Notes

Citations

Bibliography

Further reading

External links

 Official website
 About Matenadaran

 
Armenian culture
Manuscripts
Museums in Yerevan
Library buildings completed in 1957
Literary museums in Armenia
Libraries in Armenia